West Burlington is a hamlet in the western part of the Town of Burlington in Otsego County, New York, United States.

The West Burlington Memorial Church was listed on the National Register of Historic Places in 2001.

Notable person
Frances Augusta Hemingway Conant, born here

References

Hamlets in New York (state)
Hamlets in Otsego County, New York